Sir William Edward Knox OSJ, KSJI (14 December 1927 – 22 September 2001) was born in Kew, Victoria, Australia and was the Member of the Legislative Assembly of Queensland representing the district of Nundah for the Liberal Party between from 1957 to 1989. He was Liberal leader in the Legislative Assembly of Queensland from 1976 to 1978 and again from 1983 to 1988 and was given life membership that same year.

Early life
He was born in Kew, Victoria to Edward Knox and Bessie Alice (née Thomas).

Knox was one of the founders of the Liberal Party in Queensland and together with Sir James Killen established the Young Liberal movement in this state in 1949.

A company secretary and manager by profession, Knox was Vice President of the Queensland Liberal Party between 1956 and 1957.

Political career

Member of Parliament 
In 1957 he elected as the member for Nundah defeating Queensland Labor Party incumbent Jim Hadley, taking advantage of a split within Labor.

Government Minister
Knox entered the Ministry in 1965 as Transport Minister. He would later hold the portfolios of Health, Justice and Attorney-General.

After the retirement of Peter Delamothe in 1971 he was elected Deputy Liberal Leader, and in 1976 he succeeded Gordon Chalk as leader.

The Liberal's lost a net 6 seats at the 1977 election which led to the his ousting as leader in favour of Llew Edwards in the hope that he would be more publicly assertive with Premier Bjelke-Petersen.

Return to the Leadership
When the Ginger Group replaced Llew Edwards with Terry White in 1983, Knox joined the rest of the Liberals in moving to crossbench. Following their heavy defeat at the 1983 election he was once again elected as leader to lead the rump group of 8 members.

He was replaced as leader by his deputy Angus Innes in 1988, and at the 1989 election he was by defeated the ALP's Phil Heath on a 13.4% swing.

Post Political career
Upon losing his seat to the Labor he became involved in community groups.

Personal life
He had 2 sons, 2 daughters with his wife Doris Ross.

He was State Chairman of the St John Ambulance Association and the President of the Association of Independent Schools of Queensland.

A state funeral was held for him.

References

External links 

 

1927 births
2001 deaths
Liberal Party of Australia members of the Parliament of Queensland
Members of the Queensland Legislative Assembly
Australian Knights Bachelor
Australian politicians awarded knighthoods
Deputy Premiers of Queensland
Treasurers of Queensland
Attorneys-General of Queensland
20th-century Australian politicians
20th-century Australian businesspeople